Toby Wilkins is a British film director. He has directed two feature films, Splinter and The Grudge 3, and several award-winning short films.

Filmography
The Grudge 3 (2009)
Splinter (2008)
Devil's Trade FEARnet web series (2007)
Kidney Thieves, short film (2006)
Tales from the Grudge web series (2006)
Staring at the Sun, short film (2005)

References

External links

20ft High – the blog of director Toby Wilkins.
Sci-fi-online.com interview with Toby Wilkins

1972 births
Living people
English film directors